Pachora Assembly constituency is one of the 288 Vidhan Sabha constituencies of Maharashtra state in western India. This constituency is located in the Jalgaon district.

It is part of the Jalgaon Lok Sabha constituency along with another five Vidhan Sabha segments of this district, namely Jalgaon City, Jalgaon Rural, Erandol, Amalner and Chalisgaon.

Members of Legislative Assembly
 1962: Supadu Bhadu Patil, Indian National Congress
 1967: S. B. Patil, Indian National Congress
 1978: Krishnarao Maharu Patil, Indian National Congress
 1972: Wagh Onkar Narayan, Janata Party
 1980: Krishnarao Maharu Patil, Indian National Congress
 1985: Wagh Onkar Narayan, Janata Party
 1990: Krishnarao Maharu Patil, Indian National Congress
 1995: Wagh Onkar Narayan
 1999: R.O.Patil, Shiv Sena
 2004: R.O.Patil, Shiv Sena
 2009: Dilip Wagh, Nationalist Congress Party
 2014: Kishor Patil (Kishor Appa), Shiv Sena
 2019:Kishor Patil (Kishor Appa), Shiv Sena

See also
 Pachora
 Pachora Municipal Council
 List of constituencies of the Maharashtra Vidhan Sabha

References

Assembly constituencies of Maharashtra
Jalgaon district